An action-adventure game is a video game hybrid genre that combines core elements from both the action game and adventure game genres.

Typically, classical adventure games have situational problems for the player to explore and solve to complete a storyline, involving very little to no action. If there is action, it is generally confined to isolated instances. Classical action games, on the other hand, have gameplay based on real-time interactions that challenges the player's reflexes and eye-hand coordination. Action-adventure games combine these genres by engaging both eye-hand coordination and problem-solving skills.

Definition 
An action adventure game can be defined as a game with a mix of elements from an action game and an adventure game, especially crucial elements like puzzles. Action-adventures require many of the same physical skills as action games, but also offer a storyline, numerous characters, an inventory system, dialogue, and other features of adventure games. They are faster-paced than pure adventure games, because they include both physical and conceptual challenges. Action-adventure games normally include a combination of complex story elements, which are displayed for players using audio and video. The story is heavily reliant upon the player character's movement, which triggers story events and thus affects the flow of the game. Popular examples of action-adventure games include The Legend of Zelda, God of War, and Tomb Raider series.

Relationship to other genres 
When a game stops being an adventure game and becomes an action game is a matter of interpretation. There are quite a few disagreements in the community and in the media over what actually constitutes an action-adventure game. One definition of the term "action-adventure" may be '"An action/adventure game is a game that has enough action in it not to be called an adventure game, but not enough action to be called an action game." In some cases an action game with puzzles will be classified as an action-adventure game, but if these puzzles are quite simple they might be classified as an action game. Others see action games as a pure genre, while an action-adventure is an action game that includes situational problem-solving. Adventure gamers may also be purists, rejecting any game that makes use of physical challenges or time pressure. Regardless, the action-adventure label is prominent in articles over the internet and media. The term "action-adventure" is usually substituted for a particular subgenre due to its wide scope.

Subgenres 

Although action-adventure games are diverse and difficult to classify, there are some distinct subgenres. Many games with gameplay similar to those in The Legend of Zelda series are called Zelda clones or Zelda like games. Popular subgenres include:

Grand Theft Auto clone 
Grand Theft Auto clone, is a subgenre of open world action-adventure video games in the third-person perspective. They are characterized by their likeness to the Grand Theft Auto series in either gameplay or overall design. In these types of open world games, players may find and use a variety of vehicles and weapons while roaming freely in an open world setting.

Metroidvania 
Metroidvania; a portmanteau of Metroid and Castlevania, sometimes referred to as "search action", is used to describe games in this genre that generally are based on two-dimensional platformers. They emphasize both exploration and puzzle-solving with traditional platform gameplay.

Survival horror 
Survival horror, emphasize "inventory management" and making sure the player has enough ammunition and recovery items to "survive" the horror setting. This is a thematic genre with diverse gameplay, so not all survival horror games share all the features. The Resident Evil franchise popularized this subgenre.

Gameplay 

Action-adventure games are faster-paced than pure adventure games, and include physical as well as conceptual challenges where the story is enacted rather than narrated. While motion-based, often reflexive, actions are required, the gameplay still follows a number of adventure game genre tropes (gathering items, exploration of and interaction with one's environment, often including an overworld connecting areas of importance, and puzzle-solving). While the controls are arcade-style (character movement, few action commands) there is an ultimate goal beyond a high score. In most action-adventure games, the player controls a single avatar as the protagonist. This type of game is often quite similar to role-playing video games.

They are distinct from graphic adventures, which sometimes have free-moving central characters, but also a wider variety of commands and fewer or no action game elements and are distinct too from text adventures, characterized by many different commands introduced by the user via a complex text parser and no free-moving character. While they share general gameplay dynamics, action-adventures vary widely in the design of their viewpoints, including bird's eye, side-scrolling, first-person, third-person, over-the-shoulder, or even a 3/4 isometric view.

Many action-adventure games simulate a conversation through a conversation tree. When the player encounters a non-player character, they are allowed to select a choice of what to say. The NPC gives a scripted response to the player, and the game offers the player several new ways to respond.

Due to the action-adventure subgenre's broad and inclusive nature, it causes some players to have difficulty finishing a particular game. Companies have devised ways to give the player help, such as offering clues or allowing the player to skip puzzles to compensate for this lack of ability.

History

1970s and early 1980s 
Brett Weiss cites Atari's Superman (1979) as an action-adventure game, with Retro Gamer crediting it as the "first to utilize multiple screens as playing area". Mark J.P. Wolf credits Adventure (1980) for the Atari VCS as the earliest-known action-adventure game. The game involves exploring a 2D environment, finding and using items which each have prescribed abilities, and fighting dragons in real-time like in an action game. Muse Software's Castle Wolfenstein (1981) was another early action-adventure game, merging exploration, combat, stealth, and maze game elements, drawing inspiration from arcade shoot 'em ups and maze games (such as maze-shooter Berzerk) and war films (such as The Guns of Navarone).

According to Wizardry developer Roe R. Adams, early action-adventure games "were basically arcade games done in a fantasy" setting. Tutankham, debuted by Konami in January 1982, was an action-adventure released for arcades. It combined maze, shoot 'em up, puzzle-solving and adventure elements, with a 1983 review by Computer and Video Games magazine calling it "the first game that effectively combined the elements of an adventure game with frenetic shoot 'em up gameplay." It inspired the similar Time Bandit (1983). Action Quest, released in May 1982, blended puzzle elements of adventure games into a joystick-controlled, arcade-style action game, which surprised reviewers at the time.

While noting some similarities to Adventure, IGN argues that The Legend of Zelda (1986) by Nintendo "helped to establish a new subgenre of action-adventure", becoming a success due to how it combined elements from different genres to create a compelling hybrid, including exploration, adventure-style inventory puzzles, an action component, a monetary system, and simplified RPG-style level building without the experience points. The Legend of Zelda series was the most prolific action-adventure game franchise through to the 2000s. Roe R. Adams also cited the arcade-style side-scrolling fantasy games Castlevania (1986), Trojan (1986) and Wizards & Warriors (1987) as early examples of action-adventure games.

Games like Brain Breaker (1985), Xanadu (1985), Metroid (1986) and Vampire Killer (1986) combined a side-scrolling platformer format with adventure exploration, creating the Metroidvania platform-adventure subgenre. Similarly, games like 005 (1981), Castle Wolfenstein and Metal Gear (1987) combined action-adventure exploration with stealth mechanics, laying the foundations for the stealth game subgenre, which would later be popularized in 1998 with the releases of Metal Gear Solid, Tenchu: Stealth Assassins, and Thief: The Dark Project.

1990s to present 
The cinematic platformer Prince of Persia (1989) featured action-adventure elements, inspiring games such as Another World (1991) and Flashback (1992). Alone in the Dark (1992) used 3D graphics, which would later be popularized by Resident Evil (1996) and Tomb Raider (1996). Resident Evil in particular created the survival horror subgenre, inspiring titles such as Silent Hill (1999) and Fatal Frame (2001).

Action-adventure games have gone on to become more popular than the pure adventure games and pure platform games that inspired them. Recent examples include the Uncharted franchise, The Legend of Zelda: Breath of the Wild and Ark: Survival Evolved

References

External links 

 
Games and sports introduced in 1980
Video game genres
Video game terminology